Sergio Valdés Silva (11 May 1933 – 2 April 2019) was a Chilean football defender who played for Chile in the 1962 FIFA World Cup. He also played for Club Deportivo Universidad Católica.

References

External links
FIFA profile

1933 births
2019 deaths
Chilean footballers
Chile international footballers
Association football defenders
Club Deportivo Universidad Católica footballers
1962 FIFA World Cup players